, better known by his stage name , is a Japanese record producer and entrepreneur. He is the founder of Avex Group, one of the largest music labels. He is known mainly for discovering and developing new artists into stars (most notably Ayumi Hamasaki), as well as for reviving Ami Suzuki's career after she was released by her previous record label.

Radio program
His weekly radio program, started on September 5, 2009, and it is broadcast every Sunday, 1:00–1:30 am, on Nippon Broadcasting System.

Controversies

In 2004, Matsuura was the subject of some controversy when he considered leaving Avex Music Group due to a feud with Tom Yoda. Many artists, including Ayumi Hamasaki, said that they would also move in the event that he did so. Thus, stocks for Avex Trax plunged and Yoda ended up resigning, ending the feud.

In March 2009, Matsuura helped Tetsuya Komuro in the latter's fraud case. Matsuura paid the plaintiff ¥648,000,000 (¥500,000,000 for the exact amount, ¥100,000,000 for compensations and ¥48,000,000 for delay damages). 

On July 17, 2011, Matsuura closed his Twitter account due to an intense feud with fans of K-pop group JYJ.

Personal life
Matsuura lives in Denenchofu, Tokyo.

References

External links
 Personal website 

Avex Group people
Japanese record producers
Japanese music industry executives
Japanese radio personalities
People from Yokohama
1964 births
Living people
Nihon University alumni